Tyumen Urban Okrug is an urban okrug in Tyumen Oblast, Russia.  The administrative center is Tyumen.

References

Urban okrugs of Russia